Eric Arturo Morel (born October 10, 1975 in San Juan, Puerto Rico) is a Puerto Rican professional boxer. He is a former World Boxing Association (WBA) flyweight (112 lb) champion.

Amateur career 
Morel had an outstanding amateur career, and was the National Golden Gloves Light Flyweight Champion in 1994. He also was a member of the 1996 US Olympic Team as a Flyweight. His result was:

Lost to Maikro Romero (Cuba) 12-24

Professional career

Flyweight 
"Little Hands Of Steel" turned professional in 1996 and won his first 33 bouts, including the WBA World Flyweight title with a decision win over Sornpichai Kratingdaenggym in 2000 and the IBA World Super Flyweight title in 1998 against Jose Victor Burgos. He defended the belt five times with wins over Gilberto Keb Baas, Denkaosan Kaovichit, and Isidro García before losing it to Lorenzo Parra by decision in 2003.

Super Flyweight 
He then moved up in weight and took on WBA Super Flyweight title holder Martin Castillo in 2005, but lost a decision. Morel was scheduled to fight Z Gorres for the interim WBO bantamweight title on November 14, 2009, but after the latter's last fight, he (Gorres) suffered a major injury that delayed his boxing career, so the fight was called off. He then returned to the ring against Gerry Penalosa February 13, 2010; That ended in a win for Eric Morel, lifting the interim WBO bantamweight world championship. He then defeated Juan Jose Beltran December 11, 2010 as a 2-0 record since his return. His next and latest match was against Luis Maldonado April 1, 2011; That now has his record at 3-0 since his return from injury.

Professional boxing record

Outside the ring
Shortly after the loss to Castillo, Morel was convicted of sexual assault of a drunken 15-year-old girl and was sent to prison. In July 2007, Morel was granted an early release within 30 days of August 1, 2007 to allow him to serve the remainder of his sentence on extended supervision.

See also
List of world flyweight boxing champions
List of Puerto Rican boxing world champions
List of Puerto Ricans

References

External links

 

 

1975 births
Living people
Puerto Rican male boxers
Sportspeople from San Juan, Puerto Rico
Sportspeople convicted of crimes
People convicted of sexual assault
Boxers at the 1995 Pan American Games
Pan American Games competitors for the United States
Boxers at the 1996 Summer Olympics
Olympic boxers of the United States
Bantamweight boxers
Super-bantamweight boxers
World flyweight boxing champions
National Golden Gloves champions
World Boxing Association champions